Virginia Ruano Pascual and Tomás Carbonell were the defending champions, but had different outcomes. Ruano Pascual teamed up with Gastón Etlis and lost in second round to Cara and Wayne Black, while Carbonell did not compete this year due to retiring from professional tennis in 2001.

Cara Black and Wayne Black won the title by defeating Elena Bovina and Mark Knowles 6–3, 6–3 in the final. It was the 1st Grand Slam mixed doubles title for both Cara and Wayne in their respective careers. They became the first Zimbabwean pair to win a Grand Slam title

Seeds

Draw

Finals

Top half

Bottom half

External links
 Official Results Archive (WTA)
2002 French Open – Doubles draws and results at the International Tennis Federation

Mixed Doubles
2002